Jesse Marvin Unruh (September 30, 1922 – August 4, 1987), also known as Big Daddy Unruh, was an American politician who served as speaker of the California State Assembly and as the California State Treasurer.

Early life and education

Born 1922 in Newton, Kansas, Unruh served in the United States Navy during World War II. After the war, he enrolled at the University of Southern California, receiving a Bachelor of Arts degree in political science and journalism in 1948.

Career

California Assembly 
Unruh's political career began as an unsuccessful candidate for the California State Assembly in 1950 and 1952. He was elected as a member of the Assembly on his third attempt in 1954. In 1956, he was an unsuccessful candidate for Presidential elector for California as a Democrat. In 1959, he wrote California's Unruh Civil Rights Act, which outlawed discrimination by businesses that offer services to the public and was a model for later reforms enacted nationally in the 1960s and 1970s. Unruh was Speaker of the California State Assembly from 1961 to 1969 and a delegate to Democratic National Convention from California in 1960 and 1968.

Campaign work 
As a national official of the Democratic Party, he often feuded with Governor of California Pat Brown (1959–67), a fellow Democrat, and was a case-study of James Q. Wilson's treatise on machine politics, The Amateur Democrat.

Unruh was California campaign manager for John F. Kennedy in 1960 and a close Kennedy associate throughout his presidency. He helped convince Senator Robert F. Kennedy to enter the 1968 presidential race and managed his California campaign. Kennedy won the California primary, but was assassinated shortly after his victory speech at the Ambassador Hotel in Los Angeles.

U.S. President Lyndon Johnson once described Unruh as "probably one of the most selfish men" he had met in politics.

After an unsuccessful effort, managed by Unruh and Mayor Richard J. Daley of Chicago, to draft Senator Edward M. Kennedy, Unruh released California delegates to vote their conscience and announced that he would support Eugene McCarthy at the 1968 Democratic National Convention in Chicago.

Unruh left the legislature to campaign unsuccessfully for governor against Ronald Reagan in 1970. One of his campaign workers was Timothy Kraft, who a decade later was the campaign manager for the unsuccessful reelection bid of President Jimmy Carter. In 1973, Unruh ran unsuccessfully for Mayor of Los Angeles.

California Treasurer 
When he campaigned for state treasurer in 1974, the post was considered insignificant. Unruh's radio advertisements assured voters, "Make no mistake about it, I really want this job." Once elected, Unruh politicized the office. The Wall Street Journal noted he became "the most politically powerful public finance officer outside the U.S. Treasury". California pension funds were a major source of revenue for Wall Street underwriting companies, and Unruh secured campaign contributions in exchange for doing business with them. The New York Times said he had gained control of "an obscure post whose duties had long emphasized bookkeeping. In characteristic fashion, he soon transformed the job into a source of financial and political power that reached from California to Wall Street." Because as Treasurer he was an ex officio member of many California boards and commissions, Unruh supervised "the raising and expenditure of virtually all the state's money and consolidated his influence over billions of dollars in public investments and pension funds".

He served as state treasurer from 1975 until his death from prostate cancer on August 4, 1987, 8 months into his 4th term as treasurer. Unruh remains the second longest-serving California State Treasurer behind only Charles G. Johnson (who served 33 years between 1923 and 1956).

The University of Southern California Department of Political Science includes the Jesse M. Unruh Institute of Politics.

Personal life
Unruh's nickname "Big Daddy" apparently derives from a character in the Tennessee Williams play, Cat on a Hot Tin Roof. Former Senate President pro Tempore Jim Mills in his book A Disorderly House insists it was given to Unruh by then-Assemblyman Don Allen.

Unruh was a Protestant and belonged to the American Legion. He married twice, and had five children.

Unruh died of prostate cancer at his home in Marina Del Rey, California on August 4, 1987. He is buried in Santa Monica, California.

Legacy
The California State Treasurer's Building was rededicated and renamed the Jesse M. Unruh State Office Building by Gov. George Deukmejian on August 19, 1987.

The California State Capitol building's hearing room #4202 currently holds a picture of Jesse M. Unruh.

The California State Assembly Fellowship Program was renamed the Jesse Marvin Unruh Assembly Fellowship Program to honor the former Assembly Speaker and State Treasurer.

Quotes
On campaign contributions: "Money is the mother's milk of politics." 1966
On lobbyists: "If you can't eat their food, drink their booze, screw their women and then vote against them you've got no business being up here." Other versions exist, for instance "If you can't eat their food, drink their booze, screw their women, take their money and then vote against them, you have no business being up here."

See also
 Glenn E. Coolidge
 Governorship of Ronald Reagan

References

Further reading
 Boyarsky, Bill. Big Daddy: Jesse Unruh and the art of power politics (U of California Press, 2007) online
 Cannon, Lou. Ronnie and Jesse: A Political Odyssey (New York: Doubleday,1969) 
 Herzberg, Donald G., and Jess Unruh. Essays on the State Legislative Process (New York: Holt, Rinehart & Winston, 1970)
 Mills, James R. A Disorderly House, The Brown-Unruh Years in Sacramento (Berkeley: Heyday Books, 1987)
 Putnam, Jackson K (2005) Jess: The Political Career of Jesse Marvin Unruh. New York: University Press of America. .

External links 
The USC Jesse M. Unruh Institute of Politics biography on Jesse M. Unruh
Jesse Unruh Political History
The Jesse M. Unruh Assembly Fellows Program
SNAC: Jesse M. Unruh, California Legislator (Social Networks and Archival Context Project, University of Virginia)

1922 births
1987 deaths
People from Newton, Kansas
Speakers of the California State Assembly
Democratic Party members of the California State Assembly
State treasurers of California
United States Navy sailors
University of Southern California alumni
Burials at Woodlawn Memorial Cemetery, Santa Monica
20th-century American politicians
United States Navy personnel of World War II